Le Maitron is a set of labor movement biographical dictionaries compiled by historian Jean Maitron and his successor .

Volumes 

 Dictionnaire biographique du mouvement ouvrier français (DBMOF, "Biographical Dictionary of the French Labor Movement") – a 44-volume set published 1964–1997
 Later released on CD-ROM
 Dictionnaire biographique du mouvement ouvrier international (DBMOI, "Biographical Dictionary of the International Labor Movement") – 9-volume set, extending to locales beyond France
 Dictionnaire biographique, mouvement ouvrier, mouvement social de 1940 à 1968 (DBMOMS, "Biographical Dictionary, Labor Movement, Social Movement")

References

Further reading

External links 

 

Biographical dictionaries
French-language books
Books about labor history